A seed separator is a structure found in the follicles of some Proteaceae. These follicles typically contain two seeds, with a seed separator between them. The seed separator is nothing but a little chip of wood, but in some cases it serves an important function: in serotinous species, the follicles open only in response to fire, but the seed separator remains in position, thus preventing the seeds from falling out immediately, onto burnt or burning ground. Some separators loosen and fall out once they have cooled, thus ensuring that the seeds are released only after the fire has passed; others loosen and fall only after they have been moistened, thus ensuring that the seeds are released at the first rain after fire. Still others function as levers, recurving when moist and straightening when dry, and thus gradually levering the seeds out of the follicle in the course of a wet-dry cycle. This last case also occurs in non-serotinous species: follicles may open spontaneously, but seed release is delayed until the next rain.

Proteaceae
Plant anatomy